Uruguayan Chileans (Spanish: Uruguayos Chilenos) are people born in Uruguay who live in Chile, or Chilean-born people of Uruguayan descent.

Overview
Many Uruguayan-born people live in Chile, for a number of reasons. Both countries share the Spanish language; the historical origins of both nations is common (part of the Spanish Empire until the early 19th century); Chile has a bigger, more diverse economy, which attracted Uruguayans in search of opportunities; the relative geographical vicinity (Southern Cone) also helps.

Modern estimates put the figure of Uruguayans in Chile at over 9,000.

Uruguayan residents in Chile have their own institutions, for instance, the Consultative Council in Santiago.

Notable people
Past
Elio García-Austt (1919-2005), neuroscientist
José Gervasio Viera Rodríguez (1948–1990), singer
Present
Carlos Aguiar, footballer
Guillermo Amoedo, film director
Carlos Canzani, musician
Diego Guastavino, footballer
Irina Karamanos, anthropologist, partner of President Gabriel Boric
Fernando Kliche, actor
Walter Kliche, actor
Laura Prieto, model and actress
Jael Ünger, actress

See also

Chile–Uruguay relations
Chileans in Uruguay
Emigration from Uruguay

References

External links
 Blog of Uruguayans in Chile 

Ethnic groups in Chile
 
Chile
Immigration to Chile